Mount Jones is the northernmost summit of the Clark Mountains, in the Ford Ranges of Marie Byrd Land. It was discovered on aerial flights from the West Base of the United States Antarctic Service in 1940, and named for Clarence F. Jones, Professor of Geography at Clark University.

References

Mountains of Marie Byrd Land